The Laughing Policeman (released in the UK as An Investigation of Murder) is a 1973 American neo-noir thriller film loosely based on the 1968 novel of the same name by Maj Sjöwall and Per Wahlöö. The setting of the story is transplanted from Stockholm to San Francisco. It was directed by Stuart Rosenberg and features Walter Matthau as Detective Jake Martin.

Plot
A busload of passengers, including off-duty police detective Dave Evans, are gunned down and killed. Evans, on his own time, has been following a man named Gus Niles in search of information linking businessman Henry Camarero to the murder of his wife, Teresa, two years earlier.

Evans was the partner of Detective Sergeant Jake Martin, a veteran but cynical member of the Homicide Detail working the bus massacre investigation. Jake originally investigated the Teresa Camarero case and has been obsessed with his failure to "make" Camarero for the murder. Jake returns to it after many dead-end leads (including a disastrous confrontation with a deranged amputee who takes hostages at gunpoint) in the bus investigation. Niles was killed on the bus as well, and it was Niles who provided the alibi that enabled Camarero to cover up his wife's murder.

The sullen Jake and enthusiastic but impulsive Inspector Leo Larsen are paired to interview suspects. Jake shuts out Larsen from his deductions, while Larsen, despite a loose-on-the-rules and brutal side, tries to understand and gain the confidence of his new partner. Defying the orders of their police superior Lt. Steiner, they seek, find and then smoke out Camarero, leading to a chase through the streets of San Francisco and a confrontation aboard another bus.

Cast
Walter Matthau as Sgt. Jake Martin (Martin Beck in the novel)
Bruce Dern as Insp. Leo Larsen (Gunvald Larsson in the novel)
Louis Gossett Jr. as Insp. James Larrimore
Anthony Zerbe as Lt. Nat Steiner
Albert Paulsen as Henry Camerero
Val Avery as Insp. John Pappas
Paul Koslo as Duane Haygood
Cathy Lee Crosby as Kay Butler
Joanna Cassidy as Monica
Clifton James as Maloney
Gregory Sierra as Ken Vickery
Matt Clark as Coroner

Reception
On review aggregator website Rotten Tomatoes the film has a score of 57% based on reviews from 14 critics, with an average rating of 5.5/10.

Roger Ebert of the Chicago Sun-Times said, The Laughing Policeman is an awfully good police movie: taut, off-key, filled with laconic performances. It provides the special delight we get from gradually unraveling a complicated case... The direction is by Stuart Rosenberg, and marks a comeback of sorts... With The Laughing Policeman, he takes a labyrinthine plot and leads us through it at a gallop; he respects our intelligence and doesn't bother to throw in a lot of scenes where everything is explained. All the pieces in the puzzle do fit together, you realize after the movie is over, and part of the fun is assembling them yourself. And there are a couple of scenes that are really stunning, like the bus shooting, and an emergency room operation, and scenes where the partners try to shake up street people to get a lead out of them. Police movies so often depend on sheer escapist action that it's fun to find a good one.

Variety praised the film saying that "After an extremely overdone prolog of violent mass murder on a bus, The Laughing Policeman becomes a handsomely made manhunt actioner, starring Walter Matthau and Bruce Dern in excellent performances as two San Francisco detectives".

According to Chris Petit of Time Out, "By the end, complete with car chase and split-second shooting, the film has become indistinguishable from all those movies it's trying so hard to disown".

The Laughing Policeman was released on Blu-ray on November 15, 2016. Matthew Hartman of High-Def Digest, who reviewed it, wrote "[the film] could have been a great and gritty 70s thriller, unfortunately, it's primary story doesn't live up to the potential of the opening scene".

See also
List of American films of 1973

References

External links

Films directed by Stuart Rosenberg
Martin Beck films
20th Century Fox films
1970s thriller films
American police detective films
Films scored by Charles Fox
Films set in San Francisco
Films set in the San Francisco Bay Area
Films shot in San Francisco
Films based on mystery novels
1970s police procedural films
Films based on Swedish novels
1970s English-language films
1970s American films
1970s Swedish films